"Oh, Gee!" is a 1929 hit popular song written and sung by Joe Howard. The song was revived for the 1947 biopic I Wonder Who's Kissing Her Now.

References

1929 songs
Songs written by Joseph E. Howard